Danielle Baquet-Long (July 31, 1982 – July 8, 2009) was a musician from Huntington Beach, California. She is known for her collaboration with husband Will Long in the band Celer, and for her extensive solo work under the moniker Chubby Wolf (much of which was released posthumously). Danielle was a teacher of special education in music therapy, writer, poet, painter, multi-instrumentalist, and vocalist. Both her self-releases and post-mortem releases under the name Chubby Wolf have gained substantial following and review.

Celer was founded in 2005, in Huntington Beach, California, U.S.A.. After producing music for record labels, installations, and exhibits worldwide from 2005–2009, Danielle Baquet-Long died on July 8, 2009 of heart failure. In their time as a duo, they produced numerous self-released albums, sound for installations, and released work for independent labels in North America, Japan, and Europe. Between 2005 and 2007 the couple produced 22 releases. Will Long has continued Celer solo from 2009 to 2022.

Discography

Celer

Chubby Wolf
Meandering Pupa (Self-released, 2009)
L'histoire (Self-released, 2009)
Ornitheology (Self-released, 2010)
A Wispy Tear (Self-released, 2011)
The Darker Sex (Self-released, 2011)
Maudlin & Elusive (Self-released, 2011)
Los Que No Son Gentos (Self-released, 2011)
Days to Dismember/The Lows, the Sows (Self-released, 2011)
Turkey Decoy (Self-released, 2011)
The Blissful Cessation (Self-released, 2011)
The Stairway of Abstraction (Self-released, 2011) 
Microcassette Recordings (Self-released, 2012)
The Last Voices (Self-released, 2013)
Bouquets of Vacant Jouissance (Live on KCRW) (Self-released, 2013)
Envelope Petals (Self-released, 2013)
Seasick (Self-released, 2013)
It's a Small Place to Be (Self-released, 2013)

References

External links
 
 Celer at "Discogs"
 Danielle Baquet homepage
 "For Dani" feature on "Foxy Digitalis"
 "LOS ANGELES LOVED... DANI BAQUET-LONG (CHUBBY WOLF)"
 Celer at "Last FM"
 "In memory of Danielle Baquet-Long"
 "Levitation and Breaking Points: Poetry by Danielle Baquet-Long"
 "RA: The latest album from Will Long comes out in December on Glacial Movements."

1982 births
2009 deaths
American electronic musicians
Music therapists
People from Huntington Beach, California
American women in electronic music
20th-century American musicians
20th-century American women musicians
21st-century American women